Union Square Ventures (USV) is an American venture capital firm based in New York City. The firm has backed more than 130 startups, including Twitter, Etsy, Stripe, Coinbase, Zynga, Tumblr, Stack Overflow, Meetup, Kickstarter, MongoDB, Flurry, and Carta.

History 

Union Square Ventures (USV) was founded in 2003 by Fred Wilson (a former partner of Flatiron Partners) and Brad Burnham (a former Executive in Residence with AT&T Ventures). They created USV with the intent of investing in and fostering the development of early-stage companies. Their investments are "mostly U.S.-based Internet and mobile companies considered to be ‘disruptive’".

Since its establishment, USV is one of the companies that are regularly included in Red Herring’s lists of top venture capital firms. As of 2016, USV had 7 billion dollar exits, including Twitter in 2013 and Twilio in 2016. USV's 2004 fund is one of the best-performing venture capital funds in history. In 2011 USV was chosen as the best-performing venture capital firm the United States, based on investment return rate.

In 2007, Albert Wenger, the former president of del.icio.us, joined the firm as a managing partner. In 2011, Betaworks co-founder Andy Weissman joined USV.  In 2018, Rebecca Kaden, previously a General Partner at Maveron joined USV. In 2019, USV announced two new partners–Gillian Munson, formerly the CFO of XO Group, and Nick Grossman, who had previously worked at USV on special projects such as policy and crypto. In 2021, Samson Mesele, previously a corporate attorney at Wachtell, Lipton, Rosen & Katz, joined USV as general counsel and partner.

References

External links
 

Private equity firms of the United States
Companies based in New York City
Financial services companies established in 2003
Financial services companies of the United States
Venture capital firms of the United States
2003 establishments in New York City
American companies established in 2003